The Rideau River is a river in Eastern Ontario, Canada. The river flows north from Upper Rideau Lake and empties into the Ottawa River at the Rideau Falls in Ottawa, Ontario.

As explained in a writing by Samuel de Champlain in 1613,  the river was given the name "Rideau" (curtain) because of the appearance of the Rideau Falls. The Anishinàbemowin name for the river is "Pasapkedjinawong", meaning "the river that passes between the rocks."

The Rideau Canal, which allows travel from Ottawa to the city of Kingston, Ontario on Lake Ontario, was formed by joining the Rideau River with the Cataraqui River. The river diverges from the Canal at Hog's Back Falls in Ottawa.

In early spring, to reduce flooding on the lower section of the river, workers from the city of Ottawa use ice blasting to clear the ice which covers the river from Billings Bridge to Rideau Falls by cutting "keys" through the ice and using explosives to break off large sheets of ice. This practice has been going on for more than 100 years.

The regulatory authority charged with protecting the Rideau River and its tributaries is the Rideau Valley Conservation Authority.

History 
Samuel de Champlain, who was the first European to have seen the river, named it rideau (the French word for "curtain") due to the resemblance between Rideau Falls and a curtain.

In earlier times, the river was used as a transportation route between the Ottawa and Saint Lawrence River. The fertility of the lands along the banks of Rideau river attracted loyalist settlers looking for good farmlands, which led to growth of settlements in the surrounding regions. After the War of 1812, a waterway, designed by John By, was built through Rideau River connecting Kingston to Montreal.

Tributaries

Adrians Creek
Duck Creek
Tay River
Black Creek
Otter Creek
Rosedale Creek
Irish Creek
Babers Creek
Atkinsons Creek
Rideau Creek
Dales Creek
Brassils Creek
Murphy Drain
Kemptville Creek
McDermott Drain
Cranberry Creek
Steven Creek
Mud Creek
Jock River
Black Rapids Creek
Nepean Creek
Brewer Park Pond (connected via a culvert)
Sawmill Creek

Communities
Communities along the Rideau include:
 Ottawa, Ontario
 Manotick, Ontario
 Kars, Ontario
 North Grenville, Ontario
 Merrickville, Ontario
 Smiths Falls, Ontario

Islands
 Barnes Island
 Beech Island
 Cummings Island
 Green Island
 James Island
 Kilmarnock Island
 Libby Island
 Long Island
 Maple Island
 Nicolls Island
 Porter Island
 Sanders Island

See also
Ottawa's Green spaces along the Rideau River
List of Ontario rivers
Royal Swans, that occupy a stretch of the river

References

Further reading

External links

  Rideau Valley Conservation Authority
  Biodiversity of the Rideau River (CMN, nature.ca)

Rivers of Ottawa
Canadian Heritage Rivers